Cosmographiae Introductio ("Introduction to Cosmography"; Saint-Dié, 1507) is a book that was published in 1507 to accompany Martin Waldseemüller's printed globe and wall-map (Universalis Cosmographia). The book and map contain the first mention of the term 'America'.  Waldseemüller's book and maps, along with his 1513 edition of Ptolemy’s Geography, were very influential and widely copied at the time.

It is widely held to have been written by Matthias Ringmann although some historians attribute it to Waldseemüller himself. The book includes the reason for using the name America in the wall map and the globe, and contains a Latin translation of the four journeys of Amerigo Vespucci as an appendix.

The full title of the book is: Cosmographiae introductio cum quibusdam geometriae ac astronomiae principiis ad eam rem necessariis. Insuper quatuor Americi Vespucii navigationes. Universalis Cosmographiae descriptio tam in solido quam plano, eis etiam insertis, quae Ptholomaeo ignota a nuperis reperta sunt.

(translation: Introduction to Cosmography With Certain Necessary Principles of Geometry and Astronomy To which are added The Four Voyages of Amerigo Vespucci A Representation of the Entire World, both in the Solid and Projected on the Plane, Including also lands which were Unknown to Ptolemy, and have been Recently Discovered)

The map of the world in 1507, entitled Universalis cosmographia secundum Ptholomaei traditionem et Americi Vespucii aliorumque lustrationes, was published in an edition of 1000 copies, of which it seems only a single copy survives. The surviving copy was found in the library of Prince von Waldburg-Wolfegg-Waldsee in the Castle of Wolfegg in Württemberg. It was bought by the Library of Congress in 2001. This preservation seems to be due to several sheets being bound into a single cover by the cartographer, Johannes Schöner.

The map consists of twelve sections printed from woodcuts combined with metal types,  each measuring 18 x 24.5 inches (46 x 62 cm). Each section is one of four, that form one of three zones. The map uses a modified Ptolemaic coniform projection with curved meridians to depict the entire surface of the Earth.

References

External links
 
 Waldseemüller's map at the Library of Congress (includes downloadable digital image)
 Digital reconstruction of Waldseemüller's globe, 1507-2007 (animation)

1507 books
Americas
History of cartography
Geography books
Toponymy
16th-century Latin books